Acacia latipes is a shrub of the genus Acacia (family Leguminosae or Fabaceae ) and the subgenus Plurinerves that is endemic to south western Australia.

Description
Like most species of Acacia it has phyllodes rathern than true leaves. It blooms from June to October and produces yellow flowers.

Taxonomy
There are two recognised subspecies:
 Acacia latipes subsp. latipes
 Acacia latipes subsp. licina

Distribution
It is native to an area in the Goldfields-Esperance, Wheatbelt and Mid West regions of Western Australia where it is commonly situated on hills, flats and sandplains growing in sandy to sandy-loam soils over and around granite and limestone. It has a discontinuous distribution with the range of the plant extends from Hamelin Pool in the north to Quairading with scattered localised populations from around Laking King in the south to further east of Scaddan and it is usually a part of shrubland, heathland or woodland communities.

See also
List of Acacia species

References

latipes
Acacias of Western Australia
Taxa named by George Bentham
Plants described in 1842